XLR-11 (5"-fluoro-UR-144 or 5F-UR-144) is a drug that acts as a potent agonist for the cannabinoid receptors CB1 and CB2 with EC50 values of 98 nM and 83 nM, respectively. It is a 3-(tetramethylcyclopropylmethanoyl)indole derivative related to compounds such as UR-144, A-796,260 and A-834,735, but it is not specifically listed in the patent or scientific literature alongside these other similar compounds, and appears to have not previously been made by Abbott Laboratories, despite falling within the claims of patent WO 2006/069196. XLR-11 was found to produce rapid, short-lived hypothermic effects in rats at doses of 3 mg/kg and 10 mg/kg, suggesting that it is of comparable potency to APICA and STS-135.

Detection

A forensic standard for this compound is available, and a representative mass spectrum has been posted on Forendex.

Recreational use
XLR-11 was instead first identified by laboratories in 2012 as an ingredient in synthetic cannabis smoking blends, and appears to be a novel compound invented specifically for grey-market recreational use.

Legal Status

XLR-11 was banned in New Zealand by being added to the temporary class drug schedule, effective from 13 July 2012.

The U.S. Drug Enforcement Administration (DEA) made the synthetic cannabinoids UR-144, XLR11, and AKB48 Schedule I, illegal drugs under the Controlled Substances Act (CSA) for the next two years as of 16 May 2013.

It has also been banned in Florida as of 11 December 2012.

Arizona banned XLR-11 on 3 April 2013.

As of October 2015 XLR-11 is a controlled substance in China.

XLR-11 is banned in the Czech Republic.

Side effects

XLR-11 has been linked to hospitalizations due to its use.

Toxicity
XLR-11 has been linked to acute kidney injury in some users, along with AM-2201.

See also
 FAB-144
 JWH-018
 STS-135
 UR-144
 XLR-12

References

Cannabinoids
Designer drugs
Organofluorides
Indoles
Tetramethylcyclopropanoylindoles
Cyclopropanes